Camagna Monferrato is a comune (municipality) in the Province of Alessandria in the Italian region Piedmont, located about  east of Turin and about  northwest of Alessandria.

Camagna Monferrato borders the following municipalities: Casale Monferrato, Conzano, Frassinello Monferrato, Lu e Cuccaro Monferrato, Rosignano Monferrato, and Vignale Monferrato.

References

Cities and towns in Piedmont